Apolinário Paquete (born 1968 in Luanda), is an Angolan basketball coach. Paquete was the head coach of Primeiro de Agosto women's basketball team as well as of the Angola women's national basketball team at the 2003 FIBA Africa Championship.

At present, he has been the head coach of Angolan women's basketball club Interclube.

References

Basketball coaches
Angolan basketball coaches
1968 births
Living people
Sportspeople from Luanda